Leslie Pearce (13 October 1923 – 21 April 2018) was a Welsh rugby union and professional rugby league footballer who played in the 1940s and 1950s, and coached rugby league in the 1970s.

Background
Les Pearce was born in Swansea, and he died aged 94.

Coaching career

International honours
Les Pearce was the coach for Wales in the 1975 Rugby League World Cup.

Player's No.6 Trophy Final appearances
Les Pearce was the coach in Halifax's 22-11 victory over Wakefield Trinity in the 1971–72 Player's No.6 Trophy Final during the 1971–72 season at Odsal Stadium, Bradford on Saturday 22 January 1972.

BBC2 Floodlit Trophy Final appearances
Les Pearce was the coach in Leigh's 5-0 victory over Widnes in the 1972 BBC2 Floodlit Trophy Final during the 1972-73 season at Central Park, Wigan on Tuesday 19 December 1972.

References

External links
The Welshman who kicked an amazing 535 goals for Halifax
 ĎŔƑ Landmark Lunch To Celebrate 1975 World Championship
Dragons and All Blacks: Wales v. New Zealand - 1953 and a Century of Rivalry
Canterbury's Bid For Mills
You've Never Had It So Good!: Recollections of Life in the 1950s
Battle Of Brisbane Players Reunite 40 Years On
(archived by web.archive.org) Dave Fleming's Blast From The Past
A reunion to remember

1923 births
2018 deaths
Dewsbury Rams coaches
Dewsbury Rams players
Footballers who switched code
Halifax R.L.F.C. coaches
Halifax R.L.F.C. players
Leigh Leopards coaches
Rugby league players from Swansea
Rugby league second-rows
Rugby union locks
Rugby union players from Swansea
Swansea RFC players
Wales national rugby league team coaches
Welsh rugby league coaches
Welsh rugby league players
Welsh rugby union players